Milorad Karalić (born 7 January 1946) is a Serbian former handball player who competed for Yugoslavia in the 1972 Summer Olympics and in the 1976 Summer Olympics.

He was born in Potkozarje, Bosnia and Herzegovina, then Yugoslavia.

In 1972 he was part of the Yugoslav team which won the gold medal at the Munich Games. He played all six matches and scored two goals.

Four years later he was a member of the Yugoslav team which finished fifth in the Olympic tournament. He played all six matches and scored eleven goals.

External links
 

1946 births
Living people
Yugoslav male handball players
Serbian male handball players
Olympic handball players of Yugoslavia
Handball players at the 1972 Summer Olympics
Handball players at the 1976 Summer Olympics
Olympic gold medalists for Yugoslavia
Olympic medalists in handball
Medalists at the 1972 Summer Olympics